Sean Martin Long (born 2 May 1995) is an Irish professional footballer who plays as a full-back for  club Cheltenham Town.

Club career

Reading
Long joined Reading from Irish club Cherry Orchard in 2012. He made his professional debut on 26 August 2014 as a second-half substitute in a 1–0 League Cup win over Scunthorpe United.

On 16 October 2015, Long signed for League Two club Luton Town on an initial one-month loan. He made his debut for the club a day later in a 2–1 defeat away to Crawley Town. Long made four further appearances including three in League Two and one in the FA Cup before his loan was extended on 16 November 2015 until 2 January 2016, continuing to cover for Stephen O'Donnell who was recovering from a double hernia injury. He returned to Reading on 5 January 2016 after making 11 appearances for the club in all competitions.

On 15 March 2016, Long signed for National League club Braintree Town on loan until the end of the season. He made his debut for the club later that day in a 0–0 draw with Gateshead. Long made nine league appearances for Braintree, helping them to secure a place in the National League play-offs after a 3–0 win at home to Altrincham on 30 April 2016 and would face Grimsby Town in the semi-finals over two legs. He featured in the semi-final first leg as Braintree earned a 1–0 away win to gain a slender advantage over their opponents. Long featured again in the semi-final second leg, as Braintree were defeated 2–0 after extra time and 2–1 on aggregate, ending their hopes of promotion.

On 9 May 2016, Long was one of 15 Reading youth-team players offered a new contract by the club, with confirmation of his new deal being signed coming on 1 July 2016.

On 28 July 2016, following a pre-season trial, Long signed a six-month loan deal with League Two club Cambridge United. He made his debut on the opening day of 2016–17 in a 1–1 draw at home to Barnet. Long made 12 appearances and returned to Reading following the expiration of his loan spell.

Lincoln City
On 5 January 2017, Long signed a loan deal with National League club Lincoln City for the remainder of 2016–17 with a view to a permanent transfer. He made his debut two days later in Lincoln's 2–2 draw away to Ipswich Town in the FA Cup third round, having entered the match as a stoppage time substitute and completed the loan spell with 19 appearances.

Reading announced that Long would be released when his contract expired at the end of the season. He was named in Lincoln's retained list for 2017–18. Long came on as a 95th-minute substitute as Lincoln beat Shrewsbury Town 1–0 at Wembley Stadium in the 2018 EFL Trophy Final on 8 April 2018.

Cheltenham Town
Long signed for League Two club Cheltenham Town on 26 June 2018 on a two-year contract after rejecting a new contract with Lincoln. He signed a one-year extension to his contract in September 2019. Cheltenham reached the League Two play-offs in 2019–20 with a fourth-place finish on points per game after the season was suspended in March 2020 because of the COVID-19 pandemic in the United Kingdom, and were beaten 3–2 on aggregate by Northampton Town in the semi-final. Long played every minute of the club's play-off campaign and finished the season with 43 appearances and two goals. He made 23 appearances and scored two goals in 2020–21 as Cheltenham won the League Two title and promotion to League One.

International career
Long has represented the Republic of Ireland at under-16, under-17, under-18 and under-19 level. He made 12 appearances for the under-19 team between 2013 and 2014.

Long was called up to the under-21s for the first time in May 2015, along with Reading teammates Pierce Sweeney and Shane Griffin.

Career statistics

Honours
Reading
U21 Premier League Cup: 2013–14

Lincoln City
EFL Trophy: 2017–18
National League: 2016–17

Cheltenham Town
EFL League Two: 2020–21

References

External links
Sean Long profile at the Cheltenham Town F.C. website
Sean Long profile at the Football Association of Ireland website

1995 births
Living people
Association footballers from Dublin (city)
Republic of Ireland association footballers
Republic of Ireland youth international footballers
Republic of Ireland under-21 international footballers
Association football fullbacks
Cherry Orchard F.C. players
Reading F.C. players
Luton Town F.C. players
Braintree Town F.C. players
Cambridge United F.C. players
Lincoln City F.C. players
Cheltenham Town F.C. players
English Football League players
National League (English football) players